Sioux Center Community School District is a rural public school district located in Sioux Center, Iowa.  It is entirely within Sioux County, and serves Sioux Centera nd the surrounding rural area.

Gary McEldowney has served as superintendent since 2018.

Schools

Kinsey Elementary
Kinsey Elementary includes grades TK-4. TK is a half-day transitional kindergarten.

Sioux Center Middle school

The middle school includes grades 5–8.

Sioux Center High school
Established: 1973 
The high school includes grades 9–12.

Sioux Center high school

Activities 
Some of the student activities are FFA, JETS, Key Club, and Math Team.

Athletics 
Sioux Center High School has Basketball, Baseball, Cross Country, Volleyball, Football, Track and Field, Golf, Wrestling, Softball, and Soccer.  The Warriors compete in the Siouxland Conference.

State Championships

Sioux Center's varsity teams have won three basketball titles, a football championship, and two each boys' and girls' state track meets.
Boys' Basketball - 1959, 1967, 2003
Football - 1972
Boys' Track and Field - 1980, 1982
Girls' Track and Field - 1979, 1980

Student Enrollment

Recent Initiatives
A 1 to 1 initiative has been implemented in the 2013–14 school year. All 7th and 8th graders received a laptop for use at school and home. The laptop will "travel" with the students as they progress through the grades, and each successive class of 7th graders will receive their own laptop.

Iowa Tests of Basic Skills is a set of standardized tests given annually to students in Sioux Center Schools.

Notable alumni

Vern Den Herder, retired professional football player
Ko Kieft, professional football player
Dennis Muilenburg, former CEO of The Boeing Company
Christian Rozeboom, professional football player

See also
List of school districts in Iowa
List of high schools in Iowa

References

 http://www.city-data.com/school/sioux-center-high-school-ia.html
 http://www.greatschools.org/cgi-bin/ia/district-profile/317

External links
http://www.warriorwaves.blogspot.com

Education in Sioux County, Iowa
School districts in Iowa
School districts established in 1958
1958 establishments in Iowa
Sioux Center, Iowa